Christian Teilman (30 July 1843 - 4 December 1909) was a Norwegian organist, pianist, and composer.  He wrote over 250 individual compositions in his lifetime.

References

1843 births
1909 deaths
Norwegian organists
Male organists
Norwegian male composers
Norwegian male pianists
19th-century male musicians
19th-century organists